Saturnia pavoniella is a moth of the family Saturniidae. It is found in the alpine regions of Austria, Italy (including Sicily) and the Czech Republic across south-eastern Europe to northern Turkey and the Caucasus. It is possibly also present in south-eastern France.

Adults are on wing from February to June. In northern Greece they are mainly found in May.

The larvae feed on a wide variety of plants. Recorded foodplants include Rubus, Prunus spinosa, Crataegus, Quercus, Carpinus, Betula, Salix, Erica, Vaccinium, Spiraea, Filipendula, Lythrum, Potentilla, Rosa, Calluna and Hippophae. In northern Greece the preferred hosts are Rubus ulmifolius and Pyrus amygdaliformis.

External links
Saturniidae of Europe
Lepiforum.de

Pavoniella
Moths of Europe
Taxa named by Giovanni Antonio Scopoli
Moths described in 1763